Vikentije Popović-Hadžilavić  (Janjevo, Ottoman Empire, c. 1650 – Sremski Karlovci, Habsburg monarchy, 23 October 1725) was metropolitan of the Serbiam Orthodox Metropolitanate of Karlovci, and the highest-ranking prelate of the Serbian Orthodox Church in the Habsburg Monarchy, from 1713 to 1725.

Metropolitan Vikentije, the son of daskal (teacher) Lav Popović, was born in Janjevo in the Lipljan municipality of southeastern Kosovo and took monastic vows in the Patriarchal Monastery of Peć. Like all of the early metropolitans of Karlovci, Vikentije also spent his early career in the Patriarchate of Peć where he received his education.

In January 1708. he was elected as Eastern Orthodox Bishop of Buda (modern Budapest, capital of Hungary). Upon election to the metropolitan throne in 1713, he initially resided in the Monastery of Krušedol, that was plundered during the Austro-Turkish War (1716-1718), forcing him to transfer metropolitan residence to Sremski Karlovci, thus creating the base for change of title from Metropolitanate of Krušedol to Metropolitanate of Karlovci.

See also
 Eparchy of Buda
 Metropolitanate of Karlovci
 List of heads of the Serbian Orthodox Church

References

Sources

 
 

1650 births
1725 deaths
People from Lipljan
Metropolitans of Karlovci